Nicolás Jesús Giménez Alvarado (born 17 February 2000) is a Venezuelan professional footballer who plays as a forward for Venezuelan Primera División side Atlético Venezuela.

Career
Atlético Venezuela were Giménez's opening senior club. He made his first-team debut for the Venezuelan Primera División side in the Copa Venezuela on 6 July 2016, he scored his first goal in the process during a 4–1 victory over Arroceros de Calabozo of the Venezuelan Segunda División.

Career statistics
.

References

External links

2000 births
Living people
Place of birth missing (living people)
Venezuelan footballers
Association football forwards
Venezuelan Primera División players
Atlético Venezuela C.F. players